The City of Sydney is the local government area covering the Sydney central business district and surrounding inner city suburbs of the greater metropolitan area of Sydney, New South Wales, Australia. Established by Act of Parliament in 1842, the City of Sydney is the oldest, and the oldest-surviving, local government authority in New South Wales, and the second-oldest in Australia, with only the City of Adelaide being older by two years.

Given its prominent position, historically, geographically, economically and socially, the City of Sydney has long been a source of political interest and intrigue. As a result of this, the boundaries, constitution and legal basis of the council have changed many times throughout its history, often to suit the governing party of the State of New South Wales. The City of Sydney is currently governed under the City of Sydney Act, 1988, which defines and limits the powers, election method, constitution and boundaries of the council area. On 6 February 2004, the former local government area of the City of South Sydney, which itself had been created in 1989 from areas formerly part of the City of Sydney (including Alexandria, Darlington, Erskineville, Newtown and Redfern), was formally merged into the City of Sydney and the current city boundaries date from this merger.

The leader of the City of Sydney is known as the Lord Mayor of Sydney, currently held since 27 March 2004 by Clover Moore, who also served concurrently as the state Member of Parliament for Sydney and Bligh from 1988 to 2012.

Suburbs and localities in the local government area
Suburbs within or partially within the City of Sydney are:

 Alexandria
 Annandale (shared with Inner West Council)
 Barangaroo
 Beaconsfield
 Camperdown (shared with Inner West Council)
 Centennial Park (shared with City of Randwick)
 Chippendale
 Darlinghurst
 Darlington
 Dawes Point
 Elizabeth Bay
 Erskineville
 Eveleigh
 Forest Lodge
 Glebe
 Haymarket
 Millers Point
 Moore Park
 Newtown (shared with Inner West Council)
 Paddington (shared with Municipality of Woollahra)
 Potts Point
 Pyrmont
 Redfern
 Rosebery (shared with Bayside Council)
 Rushcutters Bay
 St Peters (shared with Inner West Council)
 Surry Hills
 Sydney CBD
 The Rocks
 Ultimo
 Waterloo
 Woolloomooloo
 Zetland

Localities in the City of Sydney are:

 Broadway
 Central
 Central Park
 Chinatown
 Circular Quay
 Darling Harbour
 The Domain
 East Sydney
 Garden Island
 Goat Island
 Golden Grove
 Green Square
 Kings Cross
 Macdonaldtown
 Railway Square
 Strawberry Hills
 St James
 Wynyard

History

The name Sydney comes from "Sydney Cove" which is where the English Governor (later Admiral) Arthur Phillip established the first settlement, after arriving with the First Fleet. On 26 January 1788, he named it after Thomas Townshend, 1st Viscount Sydney, who was the Home Secretary at the time, and the man responsible for the plan for the convict colony in Australia.

The "City of Sydney" was established on 20 July 1842 by the Corporation Act which encompasses present-day Woolloomooloo, Surry Hills, Chippendale and Pyrmont, an area of 11.65 km2. There were six wards established by boundary posts. These wards were: Gipps, Brisbane, Macquarie, Bourke, Cook and Phillip. A boundary post still exists in front of Sydney Square.

The boundaries of the City of Sydney have changed fairly regularly since 1900. The bankrupt Municipality of Camperdown was merged with the city in 1909. As a result of the Local Government (Areas) Act 1948, the municipalities of Alexandria, Darlington, Erskineville, Newtown, Redfern, The Glebe, Waterloo, and Paddington were added to the city. In 1968 the boundaries were changed and many of these suburbs moved to be part of a new municipality of South Sydney. South Sydney was brought back into the city in 1982, but became separate again under the City of Sydney Act of 1988 and then became smaller than its original size at 6.19 km2. It grew again in February 2004 with the merger of the two council areas, and now has a population of approximately 170,000 people.

These changes in boundaries have often resulted in control of the council by the governing party in the Parliament of New South Wales at the time; the Labor Party often sought to have traditional working-class suburbs like Redfern, Erskineville, Alexandria and Waterloo included in the council area, and the Liberal Party and its predecessors often desired a smaller council area focused on inner-Sydney or a limited/broader voting franchise. A 1987 re-organisation initiated by a Labor state government and completed in 1989 under a Liberal Coalition government saw the City of Sydney split again, with southern suburbs forming the City of South Sydney, a moved that advantaged the government of the day, as the southern suburbs now in South Sydney Council had traditionally voted Labor.

On 8 May 2003 the Labor state Government partially undid this change, when approximately 40% of the South Sydney City Council area was merged back into the City of Sydney including Camperdown, Chippendale, Darlington, East Sydney, Kings Cross and Woolloomooloo. Glebe was also transferred back from Leichhardt Council to the City of Sydney. On 6 February 2004, the remaining parts of the South Sydney City Council were merged into the City of Sydney. Critics claimed that this was performed with the intention of creating a "super-council" which would be under the control of Labor, which also controlled the NSW Government. Subsequent to this merger, an election took place on 27 March 2004 which resulted in the independent candidate Clover Moore defeating the high-profile Labor candidate, former federal minister Michael Lee and winning the position of Lord Mayor.

Boundary changes

Demographics
At the 2016 census, there were  people in the Sydney local government area, of these 51.8% were male and 48.2% were female. Aboriginal and Torres Strait Islander people made up 1.2% of the population. The median age of people in the City of Sydney was 32 years. Children aged 0 – 14 years made up 6.7% of the population and people aged 65 years and over made up 8.2% of the population. Of people in the area aged 15 years and over, 25.7% were married and 9.1% were either divorced or separated.

Population growth in the City of Sydney between the 2006 Census and the 2011 Census was 4.57%; with a significant increase of 22.93% between 2011 and 2016. When compared with total population growth of Australia of 8.81% between 2011 and 2016, population growth in the Sydney local government area was almost triple the national average. The median weekly income for residents within the City of Sydney was just under 1.5 times the national average.

The proportion of dwellings in the City of Sydney that are apartments or units is 77.1%, which is substantially different from the Australian average of 13.1%. The proportion of residents in the Sydney local government area that claimed Australian ancestry was approximately one-quarter the national average.

 1996 Census figures refer to the City of Sydney prior to its merger with the City of South Sydney.
 2001 Census data comprise the sum of the former South Sydney and the former Sydney local government areas.

Council

Current composition and election method
Sydney City Council is composed of ten Councillors, including the Lord Mayor, for a fixed four-year term of office. The Lord Mayor is directly elected while the nine other Councillors are elected proportionally. The Deputy Lord Mayor is elected annually by the councillors. Although the fixed term of the council is four years, due to delays caused by amalgamations and the COVID-19 pandemic, the previous term lasted from 10 September 2016 to 4 December 2021.

The most recent election was held on 4 December 2021, and the makeup of the council, including the Lord Mayor, is as follows:

The current Council, elected in 2021, in order of election, is:

Business vote
Unlike all other local government area in NSW (which are governed under the Local Government Act, 1993), the City of Sydney is governed under the City of Sydney Act, 1988. On 25 September 2014, the NSW Liberal/National Coalition Government of Mike Baird, in conjunction with the Shooters and Fishers Party in the Legislative Council, passed the City of Sydney Amendment (Elections) Act, 2014, which allowed businesses to have two votes each in City of Sydney elections via a compulsory non-resident register that is maintained at the expense of the City Council.

Implemented for the 2016 election and maintained by Council at an annual cost of $1.7 million, the additional business roll has been criticised as being yet another interference by the state government into the affairs of the City of Sydney and an attempt to "gerrymander" election results. At the time of the bill ABC election analyst, Antony Green, noted: "For eight decades both sides of NSW politics have viewed Sydney's Lord Mayoralty as a bauble to be delivered as soon as possible to someone that the new government thinks is right and proper to hold the position [...] Given the history ... it is a little difficult to view the proposed changes as anything other than being a state government trying again to get its way on who should be Lord Mayor of Sydney."

The Lord Mayor Clover Moore also expressed her opposition, seeing it as another attempt to attack her administration and that the new compulsory business register "placed an unworkable and costly burden on the council [...] One of the great flaws of the legislation was that it gives businesses two votes and residents just one, completely reversing one of the founding principles of Australia’s democracy: one vote, one value. [It] was not about business voting at all – it was about manipulating democracy." Moore's position has been supported by some community groups and also Labor Councillor and President of Local Government NSW, Linda Scott, who expressed her view that the business vote is "complex, costly and has no clear public benefit." However, one supporter of the business vote has been Councillor Angela Vithoulkas: "Businesses and property owners pay over 72% of the rates [in the City of Sydney], they deserve to have a voice and exercise their democratic right."

Policies, services and initiatives

Environment

The City of Sydney has adopted various policies to reduce the council's climate impact, including strategies implemented since the 2000s to reduce car pollution by investing in mass and public transit and introducing a fleet of 10 new Nissan Leaf electric cars, the largest order of the vehicle in Australia. The council has also invested in bicycle infrastructure, and cycling trips have increased by 113% across Sydney's inner-city since March 2010, with approximately 2,000 bikes passing through top peak-hour intersections on an average weekday.

The City of Sydney became the first council in Australia to achieve formal certification as carbon-neutral in 2008. The city has reduced its 2007 carbon emissions by 6% and since 2006 has reduced carbon emissions from city buildings by up to 20%. In 2008, the council adopted the Sustainable Sydney 2030 programme, which outlined various energy targets, such as a comprehensive plan to reduce energy in homes and offices within Sydney by 30%. In the commercial space, reductions in energy consumption have decreased energy bills by $30 million a year in more than half of office spaces, and solar panels] have been installed on many CBD buildings in an effort to minimise carbon pollution by around 3,000 tonnes a year. Sydney has become a leader in the development of green office buildings and enforcing the requirement of all building proposals to be energy-efficient.

The One Central Park development, completed in 2013, is an example of this implementation and design. Proposals to make all of Sydney's future buildings sustainable and environmentally friendly by using recycled water, rooftop gardens, efficient and renewable energy.

Sydney Peace Prize
The City of Sydney is a major supporter of the Sydney Peace Prize.

Libraries

Sister cities
Sydney City Council maintains sister city relations with the following cities:
  San Francisco, California, United States, since 1968
  Nagoya, Japan, since 1980
  Wellington, New Zealand, since 1982
  Portsmouth, England, United Kingdom, since 1984
  Guangzhou, China, since 1986
  Florence, Tuscany, Italy, since 1986

Friendship cities
  Paris, France, since 1998
  Berlin, Germany, since 2000
  Athens, Greece, since 2000
  Dublin, Ireland, since 2002
  Chicago, Illinois, United States, since 21 February 2019 (The City of Sydney considers the City of Chicago a "friendship city", while the City of Chicago considers the City of Sydney a "sister city.")
  Wuhan, China, since 2014

References

External links
 Official website for the City of Sydney
 Official tourism site for the City of Sydney
 

 
Sydney, City of
1842 establishments in Australia